Dunkwa-On-Offin or simply Dunkwa, is a town and the capital of the Upper Denkyira East Municipal District, a district in the Central Region of south Ghana. Dunkwa-On-Offin has a 2013 settlement population of 33,379 people.

Geography

Topography
Dunkwa-On-Offin town is located along the Offin River. Dunkwa-On-Offin is low-lying with loose quaternary sands and the town rises up to 117 metres above sea level. The town is drained by a number of rivers and streams, including the Offin River and other small steams.

See also
 Denkyira
 Gyimi River

References

Populated places in the Central Region (Ghana)